The Barber of Seville (French: Le barbier de Séville) is a 1933 French musical film directed by Hubert Bourlon and Jean Kemm and starring André Baugé, Fernand Charpin and Hélène Robert.

The film's sets were designed by the art director Robert Gys.

Cast
 André Baugé as Figaro 
 Fernand Charpin as Bazile 
 Pierre Juvenet as Bartholo 
 Hélène Robert as Rosine 
 Nane Germon as Fanchette 
 Yvonne Yma as Marcelline 
 Monique Rolland as Chérubin 
 Josette Day as Suzanne 
 Jean Galland as Comte Almaviva

References

Bibliography 
 Crisp, Colin. Genre, Myth and Convention in the French Cinema, 1929-1939. Indiana University Press, 2002.

External links 
 

1933 films
1933 musical films
French musical films
1930s French-language films
Films directed by Hubert Bourlon
Films directed by Jean Kemm
1930s French films